Marc Blank is an American game developer and software engineer.  He is best known as part of the team that created one of the first commercially successful text adventure computer games, Zork.

Career
Blank first encountered Don Woods and Will Crowther's Adventure game while he was studying at MIT in the mid-1970s, where the game was played on mainframe computers.

Blank was frustrated by the computer's tiny vocabulary; when it parsed user inputs very few words were recognized. After thinking about the problem during his undergraduate years, he started work on his own adventure game using MDL, a computer language invented at MIT. Blank and a handful of friends wrote the original version of Zork on a PDP-10 while he was attending medical school at Albert Einstein College of Medicine in New York City (he received his MD degree in 1979).

The free-play university version of Zork first became available on the MIT-DM PDP-10 in June 1977. It was then distributed by the Digital Equipment Corporation DECUS program and spread to many colleges in the United States and Canada.

Blank graduated from medical school in 1979 but elected to continue with Zork. He and several friends spent the next year developing a specialized computer language that they could use to program text adventures like Zork on the new microcomputers.

The Apple II's limited RAM required them to cut half of the original version of Zork. The new Zork for the Apple and the Radio Shack TRS-80 had a 600-word vocabulary. They founded the new company, Infocom, to publish the game and more like it. Aside from Zork I, II, and III, he designed Deadline, Enchanter, Fooblitzky, Border Zone, and Journey: The Quest Begins

In 1993 he founded Blank, Berlyn and Co. with former Infocom writer Michael Berlyn. The company's name was later changed to Eidetic after former Apple Employee [Russ Wetmore] joined as the third partner, to help program Notion, for the Apple Newton. Eidetic initially published productivity software for the Apple Newton. Eidetic's Notion: The Newton List Manager became a hit and was ultimately bundled in all Newtons.

Blank returned to text adventures in 1997 when Activision producer Eddie Dombrower asked Blank and Berlyn to create a small promotional game, Zork: The Undiscovered Underground, to promote the release of Activision's graphical game Zork: Grand Inquisitor.

As Newton sales slowed, Eidetic changed gears to focus on PC and PlayStation games, producing Bubsy 3D in 1996 and Syphon Filter in 1999. In 2000 Sony acquired Eidetic for an undisclosed sum.
  
Blank left Sony in 2004, where he focused on his email client for the Treo smartphone, ChatterEmail. On February 22, 2007, Blank announced he would no longer be "actively" working on ChatterEmail. Blank subsequently joined Palm, Inc. (who acquired ChatterEmail) and led the design and implementation of the Palm Pre's Email application. He worked in the Android group at Google from 2010 to 2012, and as a Principal Engineer at Lab126 (Amazon.com) from 2012 to 2018.

In 2013 Blank and Dave Lebling were awarded the Academy of Interactive Arts & Sciences Pioneer Award for their work on Zork.

References

External links
Marc Blank profile at MobyGames
Footage from interview with Blank for the documentary Get Lamp
"Decoupling Object-Oriented Languages from Wide-Area Networks in Lamport Clocks", Blank's most recent scholarly paper

1954 births
Amazon (company) people
American video game designers
American video game programmers
Google employees
Interactive fiction writers
Living people
Infocom
Academy of Interactive Arts & Sciences Pioneer Award recipients